is a private university in Kitakyushu, Fukuoka, Japan, established in 1962.

External links
 Official website 

Educational institutions established in 1962
Private universities and colleges in Japan
Universities and colleges in Fukuoka Prefecture
Women's universities and colleges in Japan